The 20th Division was one of the divisions of the People's Army of the Republic that were organized during the Spanish Civil War on the basis of the Mixed Brigades. Situated on the Andalusian front, the division played a minor role.

History 
The unit was created on April 3, 1937, within the Southern Army.

It was made up of the 52nd (in Hinojosa del Duque), 89th (Torredonjimeno) and 92nd (Andújar) mixed brigades. The 20th Division, which had its headquarters in Andújar, came under the command of Carlos García Vallejo. Subsequently, command of the unit fell to Urbano Orad de la Torre.

As of June 1937, the division was incorporated into the newly created IX Army Corps.

Throughout the war it did not take part in relevant military operations.

Command 
Commanders
 Carlos García Vallejo;
 Urbano Orad de la Torre;

Commissars
 Andrés Cuchillo Rodríguez, of the PSOE;

Chiefs of Staff
 Miguel González Rubio;

Organization

References

Bibliography 
 
 
 
 
 
 
 

Military units and formations established in 1937
Military units and formations disestablished in 1939
Divisions of Spain
Military units and formations of the Spanish Civil War
Military history of Spain
Armed Forces of the Second Spanish Republic
1937 establishments in Spain
1939 disestablishments in Spain